German submarine U-169 was a Type IXC/40 U-boat of Nazi Germany's Kriegsmarine built for service during World War II.
Her keel was laid down on 15 May 1941 by the Deutsche Schiff- und Maschinenbau AG in Bremen as yard number 708. She was launched on 6 June 1942 and commissioned on 16 November with Oberleutnant zur See Hermann Bauer in command.

Design
German Type IXC/40 submarines were slightly larger than the original Type IXCs. U-169 had a displacement of  when at the surface and  while submerged. She had two shafts and two  propellers.

U-169 was fitted with six  torpedo tubes (four fitted at the bow and two at the stern), 22 torpedoes, one  SK C/32 naval gun, 180 rounds, and a  SK C/30 as well as a  C/30 anti-aircraft gun. The boat had a complement of forty-eight.

Service history
The U-boat's service began with training as part of the 4th U-boat Flotilla. She then moved to the 10th flotilla on 1 March 1943 for operations.

She was sunk, in position , on 27 March 1943 by a British B-17 Flying Fortress of No. 206 Squadron RAF piloted by Flying Officer Ian Samuel.

References

Bibliography

External links

World War II submarines of Germany
German Type IX submarines
1942 ships
U-boats commissioned in 1942
U-boats sunk in 1943
Ships built in Bremen (state)
U-boats sunk by British aircraft
U-boats sunk by depth charges
Ships lost with all hands
World War II shipwrecks in the Atlantic Ocean
Maritime incidents in March 1943